Csilla Kristof is an American para-alpine skier. She represented the United States at the 2002 Winter Paralympics in alpine skiing.

She won three silver medals: in the Women's Downhill LW3,4,6/8,9 event, in the Women's Giant Slalom LW6/8 event and in the Women's Slalom LW6/8 event.

References 

Living people
Year of birth missing (living people)
Place of birth missing (living people)
Paralympic alpine skiers of the United States
American female alpine skiers
Alpine skiers at the 2002 Winter Paralympics
Medalists at the 2002 Winter Paralympics
Paralympic silver medalists for the United States
Paralympic medalists in alpine skiing
21st-century American women